Kvillsfors is a bimunicipal locality situated in Vetlanda Municipality, Jönköping County and Hultsfred Municipality, Kalmar County in Sweden with 500 inhabitants in 2010.

References

External links

Kvillsfors hemsida 
Kvillsfors grönska at vetlanda.se 

Populated places in Jönköping County
Populated places in Hultsfred Municipality
Populated places in Vetlanda Municipality